The District may refer to:

 The District, a television police drama, aired on CBS from 2000 to 2004
 The District!, a 2004 Hungarian animated film
 The District (production company), founded by film director Ruben Fleischer and David Bernard
 the District of Columbia, commonly referred to as Washington, the District or simply D.C.
 District 9, a science-fiction film

See also 
 District